Boom Bam (born Gene Heisser, 1971) is one of the founding members of Compton's Most Wanted and underground rap group N.O.T.R.

Heisser was born in Compton, California.  He met MC Eiht and Tha Chill while attending Junior High school, and a lifelong friendship developed.  In 1987 they created the rap group Compton's Most Wanted and their first album It's A Compton Thang! was released in 1989.  The group quickly became famous on the West Coast, and international fame soon followed.  After the group dissolved in 1993, Boom Bam appeared with MC Eiht on several of his solo projects.  Bam, Eiht, and Chill formed N.O.T.R. in 1995.  Atlantic Records bought the album and subsequently shelved the entire project.  Underground copies of the album are all that survived.

Boom Bam also had a brief movie career with a minor role in the blockbuster hit Menace II Society and in the movie Rhyme & Reason.  He also briefly appeared in the backyard scene of Boyz n the Hood.

Later years
Boom Bam is currently in the studio working with Hard Head Productions on his first solo album titled Still Wanted.  It was originally scheduled for release in early 2012, however as of 2021, work still continues on the album. The album will feature a track titled  ‘No Vasoline #2’, a diss track against MC Eiht inspired by ‘No Vaseline’ by Ice Cube.

He is currently working as an electrician working on alternative energy systems.

References

1971 births
African-American male rappers
American male rappers
Living people
Rappers from Los Angeles
Gangsta rappers
21st-century American rappers
21st-century American male musicians
21st-century African-American musicians
20th-century African-American people